Landmark Center or Landmark Centre may refer to:

Landmark Arts Centre, in Teddington, London Borough of Richmond upon Thames
Landmark Center (Boston), a former Sears warehouse
Landmark Center (St. Paul), in St. Paul, Minnesota